Qeshlaq Rural District is in Fandoqlu District of Ahar County, East Azerbaijan province, Iran. At the census of 2006, its population was 12,028 in 2,539 households; there were 11,448 inhabitants in 2,955 households at the following census of 2011; and in the most recent census of 2016, the population of the rural district was 9,833 in 2,953 households. The largest of its 80 villages was Efil, with 1,733 people. After the census, the rural district was elevated to district status as Fandoqlu District and divided into two rural districts.

References 

Ahar County

Rural Districts of East Azerbaijan Province

Populated places in East Azerbaijan Province

Populated places in Ahar County